Tiziana Zennaro, best known as Vittoria Risi (born 3 November 1978) is an Italian pornographic actress and television personality.

Life and career
Born in Pellestrina, Venice (Italy), Risi graduated at the Academy of Fine Arts, then she started a career as a real estate agent in her hometown and as a painter. She debuted in the adult industry in 2008, starring in the film Barcelona in love.

In June 2008, Risi took part to the Sky Italia docufiction Ciak, si giri!.  In 2010 she played Moana Pozzi in I Segreti di Moana directed by Riccardo Schicchi.  The same year she featured a human representation of the Giorgione's paint "La Nuda" in an exhibition about the artist at Palazzo Grimani in Venice.  In 2011 Risi took part in the 54th edition of the Venice Biennale of Contemporary Art posing nude in the installation of Gaetano Pesce, part of the "Italian Pavilion" curated by Vittorio Sgarbi.

Risi appeared on several television programs including Matrix, Stracult, Ciao Darwin, Artù and Niente di personale. She also starred in the practical jokes of the FX show Sexy Camera all’italiana (2011-2012).

Awards
2010 Venus Award - Best Newcomer Actress (Europe)

References

Further reading
Niccolò Zancan, "Vittoria Risi: In tv il sesso serve per fare carriera, ma a noi piace davvero", La Stampa, 1 July 2009

External links

 

1978 births
Italian pornographic film actresses
Italian television personalities
Living people
Actors from the Metropolitan City of Venice